The 2018–19 Women's England Hockey League season or Investec Hockey League (for sponsorship reasons) was the 2018–19 season of England's field hockey league structure. The regular season started on 22 September 2018 until 30 March 2019, with a winter break in December and January for the Indoor season. The playoffs took place on 13 and 14 April. 

Holcombe topped the regular season table but Surbiton sealed the Championship after winning the playoffs. Clifton Robinsons won the season ending Cup competition.

Premier League

Standings

Play–offs

Standings

Fixtures

Classification round

Semi-finals

Final

Women's Championship Cup

Quarter-finals

Semi-finals

Final

See also
2018–19 Men's Hockey League season

References

2018–19
England
2018 in English sport
2019 in English sport